Daesitiates were an Illyrian tribe that lived on the territory of today's central Bosnia, during the time of the Roman Republic. Along with the Maezaei, the Daesitiates were part of the western group of Pannonians in Roman Dalmatia. They were prominent from the end of the 4th century BC up until the beginning of the 3rd century CE. Evidence of their daily activities can be found in literary sources, as well as in the rich material finds from Central Bosnian cultural group that is commonly associated with tribe of Daesitiates.

Etymology 

The name is thought to be connected to the Illyrian word for ram. It is also believed that it may derive from the Proto-Albanian term for ram, *dalša

History 

The Illyrian tribe Daesitiates lived on the territory of today's central Bosnia, during the time of the Roman Republic, and along with the Maezaei, they were part of the western group of Pannonians in Roman Dalmatia. Because the Daesitiates were present during Roman rule in the western Balkans, their name can be found in many inscriptions and historical works of ancient writers. During the 19th century, scientific interest in the Daesitiates materialized whereby research was focused in parts of Upper Bosnia. However, all research efforts have yet to provide a complete analysis of the Daesitiates. They were one of the main components of the Illyrian ethno-cultural complex that stretched from the southern Adriatic to the Danube in the north. The capital of the tribe could be in the modern day town of Breza located in central part of Bosnia. They developed cohesive community that was characterized by clearly defined political, social and economic structures. Because of their favorable geographical position and rich ore deposits and fertile land they played significant role among neighboring Illyrian tribes. They have developed a degree of cultural unity and several organized centres.

Roman Empire 

After nearly three centuries of political independence, the Daesitiates (and their polity) were conquered by Roman Emperor Augustus. Afterwards, the Daesitiates were incorporated into the province of Illyricum with a low total of 103 decuriae. Ultimately, the widening gap between the Roman government and its subjects in Illyricum led to the Great Illyrian revolt, which began in the spring of 6 AD.

The Daesitiates were the first to revolt under the leadership of Bato the Daesitiate and were soon joined by the Breuci. Other natives were recruited to fight against the Marcomanni while the rebellion swiftly overtook enormous areas of the western Balkans and the Danube region. The four-year war, which lasted from AD 6 to 9, saw huge concentrations of Roman forces in the area, (on one occasion 10 legions and their auxiliaries in a single camp), with whole armies operating across the western Balkans and fighting on more than one front. The role of the Daesitiates in the rebellion was immense, which contributed to their ultimate disappearance in subsequent Romanization that followed. Their identity in the later antiquity was transformed into municipal identities and a provincial Dalmatian identity.

Archeological sites 

Considerable number of remains of fortifications, villages and settlements were left behind. Some of them were partly investigated by archaeological excavations during which numerous necropolis and tombs were discovered such as fortifications in the Lašva Valley, Gradine near Kiseljak, Gradine in Sarajevo Field, archeological site of Kamenjak. However, most significant site was found in Bugojno, called Gradina Pod. It is characterized by urban-type settlements located close to large arable land complexes and contained high level of residential architecture.

References

Bibliography 

 
 Andrijana PRAVIDUR - Prilog poznavanju metalurških središta željeznodobnih naselja Srednje Bosne u svijetlu novih istraživanja – Zemaljski muzej Bosne i Hercegovine, Sarajevo, 2011

External links 
 The Daesitiates: The Identity-construct between contemporary and ancient perceptions
 Roman conquest of the Sarajevo Region and its consequences on the example of urbanism and Early Christian (Late Antique) architecture
 Salmedin Mesihovic – Ilirike – Illyrian nations Autariates and Daesitiates
Roman wolf and Illyrian snake, Last Battle  Salmedin Mesihović, 2011 (in Bosnian)
Ancient Illyrians of Bosnia and Herzegovina by Ardian Adzanela

Illyrian tribes
Illyrian Bosnia and Herzegovina
Ancient tribes in Bosnia and Herzegovina
Tribes conquered by Rome
Tribes conquered by the Roman Republic